Events from the year 1780 in art.

Events

Works

 Jacques-Louis David
 Portrait of Count Stanislas Potocki
 Saint Roch Interceding with the Virgin for the Plague-Stricken
 Jean-Pierre Norblin de La Gourdaine – Les Marionettes polonaises
 Francisco Goya – Christ Crucified
 Francis Holman – The moonlight Battle of Cape St Vincent, 16 January 1780
 Jacob More
 Landscape with Classical Figures, Cicero at his Villa
 Mount Vesuvius in Eruption: The Last Days of Pompeii
 Sir Joshua Reynolds – The Ladies Waldegrave
 John Trumbull – George Washington
 Francis Wheatley – The Irish House of Commons
 Johann Zoffany
 Double Portrait of Henry and Mary Styleman (commissioned)
 Portrait of Tipu Sultan

Births
 January 10 – Pieter Christoffel Wonder, Dutch painter active in England (died 1852)
 February 15 – Alfred Edward Chalon, Swiss portrait painter (died 1860)
 February 18 – Alexey Venetsianov, Russian genre painter (died 1847)
 April 14 – Edward Hicks, American folk artist (died 1849)
 June 12 – Henry Hoppner Meyer, English portrait painter (died 1847)
 August 8 – Étienne Bouhot, French painter and art teacher (died 1862)
 August 29 – Jean-Auguste-Dominique Ingres, French Neoclassical painter (died 1867)
 September – Samuel Colman, English painter (died 1845)
 September 15 – Johann Peter Krafft, German-Austrian painter (died 1856)
 October 26 – Alexandre-Évariste Fragonard, French painter and sculptor in the troubadour style (died 1850)
 date unknown
 Johann Adam Ackermann, German landscape painter (died 1853)
 Giovacchino Cantini, Italian engraver (died 1844)
 Jan Krzysztof Damel, Lithuanian neoclassicist painter (died 1840)

Deaths
 February 14 – Gabriel de Saint-Aubin, French draftsman, printmaker, etcher and painter (born 1724)
 February 21 – Francesco Foschi, Italian landscape painter (born 1710)
 March 3 – Joseph Highmore, British portrait and historical painter (born 1692)
 May 6 – Gaspare Bazzani, Italian painter active in Reggio as a painter of vedute or landscapes (date of birth unknown)
 July 11 – Luis Egidio Meléndez, Spanish still-life painter (born 1716)
 September 6 – Françoise Basseporte, French court painter (born 1701)
 September 7 – Pieter Barbiers, Dutch painter (born 1717)
 October 17 – Bernardo Bellotto, Italian urban landscape painter or vedutista, and printmaker in etching (born 1720)
 date unknown
 James Giles, British porcelain decorator (born 1718)
 Dionigi Valesi, Italian printmaker active in Verona and Venice (born 1750)
 probable
 Robert Hunter, Irish painter (date of birth unknown)
 Nicolas Jean Baptiste Poilly, French draftsman and engraver (born 1712)
 Rocco Pozzi, Italian painter and engraver (born 1700)
 Wenceslaus Werlin, Austrian portrait artist (date of birth unknown)

 
Years of the 18th century in art
1780s in art